The TES 28 Magnam (English: Magnum) is a Polish sailboat, that was designed by Tomasz Siwik and was first built in 2010.

Production
The boat is built by Stocznia TES - Yacht (English: TES Yacht Shipyard) in Poland and remained in production in 2022.

Design

The TES 28 Magnam is a small recreational keelboat, built predominantly of fiberglass. It has a fractional sloop rig, an internally-mounted spade-type rudder controlled by a tiller or optionally a wheel and a retractable centreboard or optional fixed keel. It displaces  and carries  of ballast.

The centreboard version can be transported by trailer.

The boat can be fitted with either and inboard or outboard motor.

See also

List of sailing boat types

Similar sailboats
Alerion Express 28
Aloha 28
Beneteau First 285
Beneteau Oceanis 281
Bristol Channel Cutter
Cal 28
Catalina 28
Cumulus 28
Grampian 28
Hunter 28
Hunter 28.5
Hunter 280
O'Day 28
Pearson 28
Sabre 28
Sea Sprite 27
Sirius 28
Tanzer 8.5
Tanzer 28
Viking 28

References

External links

Keelboats
2010s sailboat type designs
Sailing yachts
Trailer sailers
Sailboat type designs by Tomasz Siwik
Sailboat types built by Stocznia TES - Yacht